Bowlby is a surname. Notable people with the surname include:

 Anthony Alfred Bowlby (1855–1929), British surgeon and pathologist, son of Thomas William Bowlby
 George Herbert Bowlby (1865–1916), Canadian physician, municipal politician, and military officer
 Henry Thomas Bowlby (1864–1940), Headmaster of Lancing College in the 1920s
 Henry Bowlby (1823–1894), Bishop Suffragan of Coventry 1891-1894
 John Bowlby (1907–1990), British developmental psychologist, son of Anthony Alfred Bowlby
 Ronald Anthony Bowlby (1926-2019), Anglican Bishop of Southwark 1980-1991
 Thomas William Bowlby (1818–1860), correspondent to The Times
 Ward Hamilton Bowlby (1834–1917), Canadian lawyer and politician
 April Bowlby (born 1980), American actor

See also

 Bowlby baronets, a title in the Baronetage of the United Kingdom
 Bowlby, West Virginia, unincorporated community